Árran is an English language quarterly of Sami culture and news.  The editor of Árran is Evelyn Ashford, successor to long-time editor Arden Johnson. Árran was founded by the late Mel Olsen in 1995.  Published by the Sami Siida of North America (SSNA), the newsletter is by and for Sami North Americans and friends. Árran headquarters are in Minneapolis, Minnesota. The SSNA council makes up the editorial advisory board.

The word árran refers to the fire in the center of the lavvu, the iconic tent-symbol of Sami cultures. Issues contain articles relating to Sami culture and identity, poetry, and news from Sápmi by contributors from Sápmi and North America. Árran also has a companion blog, currently under a remodeling program.

See also
Báiki an English journal about Sami issues in northern America.
Sami Siida of North America a network for Sami in North America.

External links 
Árran homepage
Árran North American Sami Newsletter

Cultural magazines published in the United States
European-American culture in Minneapolis–Saint Paul
Magazines established in 1995
Magazines published in Minnesota
Sámi-American history
Sámi magazines
Mass media in Minneapolis–Saint Paul